Zubovka was a rural locality (an inhabited locality) under the administrative jurisdiction of the urban-type settlement of Pechenga in Pechengsky District of Murmansk Oblast, Russia.  It was abolished in December 2009 due to depopulation.

References

Abolished inhabited localities in Murmansk Oblast